Thesingu Rajendar (born 9 May 1955), also known as Vijaya T. Rajendar or T. R., is an Indian actor, filmmaker, musician, cinematographer and distributor who works primarily in Tamil film industry. He is also a politician in Chennai, Tamil Nadu. Rajendar is known for being able to speak in rhyming sentences spontaneously.

Family
T. Rajendar is married to former actress Usha Rajendar. They have two sons, Silambarasan and Kuralarasan, and one daughter, Ilakiya. His wife has served as the producer for some of his films, such as Kadhal Azhivathillai (2002).

Film career
Rajendar started off in the Kollywood industry making successful films which included him as an actor, playback singer, dancer and scriptwriter. He gained popularity through his one-of-a-kind style of acting. He normally serves as, but not limited to director, actor, songwriter, art director, production manager and playback singer. During the 1980s, all his movies were blockbusters, running for years and the songs were also well appreciated. He is known for introducing new faces in his movies, and many of the actresses who debuted in his movies have been successful in South Cinema, including Amala, Nalini, Jyothi, Jeevitha and Mumtaj.

After some years, Rajendar's films started to decline in popularity because his films became too predictable, tending to follow the same storyline and oratory style of repetitious dialogues with little if any meaning. For example, his films always contain a sentimental scene involving the hero's younger sister in distress, coupled with the same rhyming rhetoric and gestures.

Rajendar recently started his own web TV channel called 'Kural TV' (Voice TV). Originally he wanted to start a 24-hour TV channel but could not, due to problems arising while securing a license. The channel, apart from broadcasting his movies and speeches, tends to echo sentiments towards the plight of Tamils (especially women) in Sri Lanka.

Rajendar had started talking with "common" people through Skype and discussing latest politics in the recent years. Rajendar also distributes films under his home banner "Simbu cine arts". His latest film distribution, as of mid-2011 is his son Silambarasan's film Vaanam, which will be distributed in the Chennai and Madurai region.

Since early 2008, Rajendar has been slowly working on the production of a film titled Oru Thalai Kadhal, a tale based on a village singer, in which he stars in the lead role. In 2011, he released a first look poster for the film and revealed that three heroines from Mumbai would star alongside him. He provided an update in 2014, that the film was still under production and that it was sixty-five percent complete. He has also revealed that he was working on a script to launch his second son, Kuralarasan, as a lead actor.

Political career
Rajendar founded the Thayaga Marumalarchi Kazhagam party in 1991 after he had been expelled from the Dravida Munnetra Kazhagam (DMK) party. In 1996, after Vaiko's departure from the DMK and the formation of Marumalarchi Dravida Munnetra Kazhagam, Rajendar's TMK merged with the DMK. Rajendar left the DMK again in 2004, to form the All India Latchiya Dravida Munnetra Kazhagam. Before expulsion, he was the propaganda secretary of DMK and was elected from Park Town constituency in the 1996 Assembly polls. He further supported the AIADMK in the 2006 Assembly elections. After those 2006 elections, the DMK came back to power and he was made vice-chairman of the Small Savings Scheme. He subsequently quit the post.

Filmography

As playback singer

Distributor
Vaanam (2011)
Vaalu (2015)
Kadamaiyai Sei (2022)

Television
Super Kudumbam - Sun TV
Arattai Arangam - Sun TV
''Nyayam Endrum Solven - Vijay TV

References

External links
 
 Interview with TR

Tamil male actors
Tamil film score composers
Living people
Tamil film directors
Tamil film poets
Film directors from Tamil Nadu
Tamil film cinematographers
Tamil playback singers
Tamil Nadu MLAs 1996–2001
People from Mayiladuthurai district
Annamalai University alumni
Male actors in Tamil cinema
Indian actor-politicians
Dravida Munnetra Kazhagam politicians
Tamil screenwriters
Screenwriters from Tamil Nadu
21st-century Indian singers
Male actors from Tamil Nadu
20th-century Indian male actors
21st-century Indian male actors
20th-century Indian composers
21st-century Indian composers
Musicians from Tamil Nadu
Film producers from Tamil Nadu
Indian film distributors
Indian male film actors
1955 births